The Yeniseian people are a Siberian population that speaks Yeniseian languages. Despite evidence pointing to the historical presence of Yeniseian populations throughout Central Siberia and Northern Mongolia, only the Ket people survive today. The modern Kets live along the eastern middle stretch of the Yenisei River in Northern Siberia. According to the 2010 census, there were 1,220 Kets in Russia.

Based on hydronymic data, the Yeniseians originated from the area around the Sayan Mountains and the southern tip of Lake Baikal. The known historical distribution of the Yeniseians is likely to represent a northward migration, with the modern-day Kets representing the very northernmost expansion of the language family. This migration possibly occurred as a result of the fall of the Xiongnu confederation, which, according to Alexander Vovin, is likely to have had a Yeniseian-speaking ruling elite.

The Jie people, a branch of the Xiongnu who established the Later Zhao state in China, are likely to have been Yeniseian rather than Turkic in origin, as supported by linguistic and ethnogeographic data.

With the proposal of the Dené–Yeniseian language family, the Yeniseians have been linked to Native Americans, particularly the Athabaskans. It has been suggested that the Yeniseians represent a back-migration from the Bering land bridge to Central Siberia.

History 
Not much is known about the history of the Yeniseian people. According to several historians, the Yeniseians were part of the Xiongnu and were possibly the ruling elite of this confederation. It is also suggested that they played an important role in the Hunnic Empire.

The Jie people, possibly having some relation to Yeniseian, created the Later Zhao dynasty and conquered parts of northern China. Based on linguistic records, they are considered to be a Pumpokolic tribe, a theory supported by evidence of long-term Pumpokolic inhabitation in northern Mongolia. After some time, they were defeated and either murdered or assimilated into the Han society. Like the Jie people, most other Yeniseian groups either went extinct or were assimilated into other ethnicities, most notably Turkic and Mongolic people.

By the time of Russian conquest, only six remaining Yeniseian languages could be documented: the northern Ket and Yugh, the southern Kott and Assan, and the central Arin and Pumpokol. Edward Vajda has proposed that, based on hydronymic analysis, the distribution of Yeniseians as recorded by the Russians represents a recent northward migration of the Yeniseians deep into Siberia, in the process abandoning their original homeland in northern Mongolia and south Siberia. This is based on the observation that while river names in the circumpolar region (the modern distribution of Yeniseians) are of Turkic, Mongolic, Ugric, or Tungusic origin, those in the area south of Lake Baikal clearly have Yeniseian origins. Indeed, Russian sources record that even after the 17th century, the Ket were continuing to expand northward down the Yenisei River, and the modern Ket-speaking area appears to be representative of the northernmost reaches of Yeniseian migration.

Eventually, most of these languages surviving into the 17th century also went extinct, with the Kott-Yugh undergoing a language shift to Khakas, and the Arin-Pumpokol shifting to either Khakas or Chulym Tatar. The last remnants of the Yeniseians, the Ket people, are a recognized minority group in Russia. Many younger Kets are now abandoning their language in favour of Russian.

It was first proposed by Edward Vajda that Yeniseians are directly related to certain indigenous peoples of the Americas. Specifically, the Yeniseians are thought to be closely related to the Na-Dene populations of Canada and Alaska. More recent research has suggested that the Yeniseians and the Na-Dene may be the result of a radiation out of Beringia, with the Yeniseians representing a back-migration into central Siberia from the Bering land bridge.

It has been also suggested that there can be a possible connection between the Hungarian language and the Yeniseian languages.

Language 
The Yeniseian language family is an endangered family with only one surviving branch. The Ket language, the very northernmost Yeniseian language, has only about 213 native speakers as of 2010. Kellog in Russia is the only place where Ket is still taught in schools. Special books are provided for grades second through fourth but after those grades there is only Russian literature to read that describes Ket culture. There are no known monolingual speakers for now.

Despite this, Yeniseian languages have been significant in Chinese, Mongolian, and Central Asian history. Both the ruling elite of the Xiongnu and that of the Later Zhao dynasty appear to have spoken Yeniseic. It has been suggested that the Xiongnu underwent a linguistic shift from Yeniseian to Oghur Turkic in the process of westward migration, eventually becoming the Huns.

Many recognisable Turkic and Mongolic words, such as the royal titles Khan, Khagan, and Tarqan, and the word for "sky" and later "god", Tengri, are suggested to be loanwords from Yeniseian. Tengri in particular has been derived from Yeniseian tɨŋVr by linguist Stefan Georg, in an analysis praised as "excellent" by Alexander Vovin.

Genetics 

The Yeniseians are closely related to other Siberians, East Asians and Indigenous peoples of the Americas. They belong mostly exclusive to yDNA haplogroup Q-M242.

According to a 2016 study, the Ket and other Yeniseian people originated likely somewhere near the Altai Mountains or near Lake Baikal. It is suggested that parts of the Altaians are predominantly of Yeniseian origin and closely related to the Ket people. The Ket people are also closely related to several Native American groups. According to this study, the Yeniseians are linked to the Paleo-Eskimo groups.

The ancestors of Yeniseian people may have been related to the Syalakh culture of ancient Yakutia. Yeniseian people, specifically Ket, also show high amounts of affinity towards Tuvans and other Indigenous peoples of Siberia, suggesting that Yeniseian ancestry can be linked to Paleo-Siberians, which replaced previous Upper-Paleolithic Siberians (Ancient North Eurasian) as the dominant population, and were subsequently largely assimilated by Neo-Siberians from Northeast Asia.

Physical appearance 
Modern Yeniseian peoples (Ket) have diverse phenotypes, ranging from Amerindian-like to Northeast Asian-like appearance, in line with their genetic ancestry. The historical Jie tribe of the western Xiongnu, often suggested to be of Yeniseian origin, but others maintaining an Iranian affiliation, were described as resembling other East Asians but also possessing certain distinct traits such "deep-set eyes, high nose bridges and heavy facial hair". The Jie tribe may have originated from the merging of eastern Iranian and Yeniseian groups, and can be linked to Scythian cultures.

References 

 
History of Mongolia
Nomadic groups in Eurasia
Ancient peoples of China
Inner Asia
Ancient peoples
Ethnic groups in Russia
Ethnic groups in Siberia
Ket people
Indigenous peoples of North Asia
Indigenous small-numbered peoples of the North, Siberia and the Far East
Turukhansky District